Tangambalanga , or Tangam for short, is a town in north-eastern Victoria, Australia. The residential district located near the intersection with the Kiewa Valley Highway is known as "Kiewa", with Tangambalanga proper beginning on the other side of the small valley flood plain.

The town's name is derived from the Dhudhuroa word for the white clawed lobster, Murray crayfish.  The Town was the site for an Aboriginal reserve, gazetted as such in 1862, with local landowner, Thomas Mitchell, acting as the local "Protector of Aborigines".

The Post Office opened on 1 December 1911.

Situated in a valley, the town exists around the dairy and cheese factory of the Murray Goulburn Co-operative, which processes milk for the fresh milk market, as well as butter and cheese.

The town also contains a child care centre, kindergarten, swimming pool, football and cricket fields, vet clinic, mechanic, the Kiewa Valley Primary School, two general stores, a pharmacy and a pub.  Most shopping is done in Albury-Wodonga, and many residents commute to the larger centre for work.

References

External links

Towns in Victoria (Australia)
Shire of Indigo